Transport in the German Democratic Republic was the responsibility of the Ministry of Transport of the German Democratic Republic.

See also
Deutsche Reichsbahn (East Germany)
VEB Automobilwerk Eisenach (AWE)
Interflug
Trabant
Barkas (van manufacturer)
Wartburg (car)

Economy of East Germany
Transport in East Germany